Eve of Destruction is the debut studio album released by American folk music singer-songwriter Barry McGuire, released in 1965. The album features McGuire's signature song "Eve of Destruction", written by P.F. Sloan, who also wrote many other songs on the album. It also features McGuire's cover versions of songs by several artists, including Bob Dylan. Eve of Destruction peaked at No. 37 on the Billboard 200 album chart and spent a total of 21 weeks on the chart.

Track listing
 "Eve of Destruction" (P.F. Sloan) – 3:38
 "She Belongs to Me" (Bob Dylan) – 2:47
 "You Never Had It So Good" (Sloan, Steve Barri) – 3:06
 "Sloop John B" (credited to Sloan, Barri, Bones Howe, Barry McGuire) – 3:04
 "Baby Blue" (Dylan) – 3:16
 "Sins of a Family" (Sloan) – 3:01
 "Try to Remember" (Tom Jones, Harvey Schmidt) – 3:23
 "Mr Man on the Street – Act One" (Sloan)– 6:20
 "You Were on My Mind" (Sylvia Tyson) – 2:32
 "Ain't No Way I'm Gonna Change My Mind" (Sloan, Barri) – 2:30
 "What's Exactly's the Matter with Me" (Sloan)  – 2:32
 "Why Not Stop and Dig It While You Can" (McGuire) – 2:15

Personnel

Musicians
 Barry McGuire – vocals, guitar, harmonica
 P. F. Sloan – guitar
 Tommy Tedesco – guitar
 Larry Knechtel – bass
 Hal Blaine – drums
 Steve Barri – percussion

Technical
 Lou Adler – producer
 P. F. Sloan, Steve Barri – co-producers
 "Bones" Howe – engineer
 Guy Webster – cover photography
 George Whiteman – cover layout

References

External links
 

1965 albums
Albums produced by Lou Adler
Barry McGuire albums
Dunhill Records albums